Emmanuelle Frederique Vaugier (born June 23, 1976) is a French-Canadian film and television actress. Vaugier has had recurring roles as Detective Jessica Angell on CSI: NY, Mia on Two and a Half Men, Dr. Helen Bryce on Smallville, FBI Special Agent Emma Barnes on Human Target, and as The Morrigan on Lost Girl. In feature films, Vaugier appeared, albeit in a minor role, alongside Michael Caine and Robert Duvall in Secondhand Lions. She starred as Addison Corday in Saw II, reprising her role in Saw IV, and had a supporting part in the Josh Hartnett film 40 Days and 40 Nights.

Early life
Vaugier was born in Vancouver, the daughter of French immigrants. She grew up in a Roman Catholic, French-speaking household. She attended Crofton House School, a girls private school, for 10 years until she transferred to Magee Secondary School, which offers a flexible academic program for professional and pre-professional student athletes, artists and musicians (SPARTS), for the last two years of high school. She has an older brother, Jason.

Career

Television
Vaugier played the role of young, upstart Maria Alcobar in a 1995 episode of Highlander: The Series. In 2004, she played Lindsey Kellogg on the short-lived Fox Television series North Shore. She has also had guest-star spots on Veronica Mars, Supernatural, The Outer Limits, Higher Ground, Andromeda, Smallville, and Charmed.  She also appeared in the Emmy Award nominated miniseries The Beach Boys: An American Family where she portrayed Mike Love’s wife, Suzanne. Vaugier also completed a starring role in MOW Veiled Truth for the Lifetime Network. She is also known for her role during the first two seasons of One Tree Hill, as Nicki, Jake's (Bryan Greenberg) ex-girlfriend and mother to their child, Jenny.

From 2005–2015, Vaugier guest starred in twelve episodes of CBS's hit sitcom Two and a Half Men as Mia, a ballet teacher with whom Charlie Harper fell in love and almost married. In 2005, she also played the title character in the Painkiller Jane television movie for the Sci Fi Channel. She first became noticed by the science fiction community when she portrayed Dr. Helen Bryce, the love interest of Lex Luthor, on the WB's hit drama Smallville in 2002–2003.
Vaugier had a recurring role from 2006–2009 on the CBS show CSI: NY as Detective Jessica Angell. She left the show after the fifth season due to budget cuts.

Vaugier appeared in two episodes of the Fox series Human Target as FBI agent Emma Barnes, who is first introduced to the show on January 26, 2010, in the episode "Embassy Row".
Vaugier also had a recurring role on the Syfy series Lost Girl as The Morrigan, the leader of the Dark Fae.

Film
Vaugier appeared as Addison in Saw II and Saw IV. In the Canadian film Unearthed, she played Annie, the sheriff of a small rural desert town. She appeared in the film 40 Days and 40 Nights, which starred Josh Hartnett. 
She had starring roles in Suddenly Naked, in which she plays a Latin pop sensation; the TV-movie Mindstorm, a science-fiction thriller; and Ripper, a psychological thriller about students who mysteriously disappear after enrolling in a class about serial killers. She stars also in the sequel to Mirrors, which is directed by Víctor Garcia.
Maxim magazine featured her on the cover of the February 2006 issue in the United States. Three months later, she landed spot #31 on their annual Hot 100 list.

Games
Vaugier appeared in Need for Speed: Carbon (2006) as Nikki. She is the girlfriend of the antagonist Darius in the game (love interest of the protagonist).

Filmography

Film

Television

Video games

Personal life 
Vaugier was in a two year relationship with Chuck Lorre, which ended in 2012.

References

External links
 
 

1976 births
Actresses from Vancouver
Canadian film actresses
Canadian television actresses
Franco-Columbian people
Canadian people of French descent
Living people
20th-century Canadian actresses
21st-century Canadian actresses